Todor Pramatarov (born 8 August 1968) is a former Bulgarian association football player. He was the top scorer of the 1997 championship (with 26 goals for Slavia Sofia).

A native of Sofia, Pramatarov played as a forward for FC Lyulin, PFC Montana, Lokomotiv Sofia, CSKA Sofia, Slavia Sofia, PFC Shumen, Litex Lovech, Greek AO Kavala, Velbazhd Kyustendil, Pirin Blagoevgrad, Vihren Sandanski and in Cypriot Aris Limassol.

During his career Pramatarov played in 440 matches and scored 223 goals.

References

External links
 PFL stats

1968 births
Living people
Bulgarian footballers
PFC Slavia Sofia players
PFC CSKA Sofia players
FC Lokomotiv 1929 Sofia players
PFC Litex Lovech players
FC Montana players
OFC Vihren Sandanski players
OFC Pirin Blagoevgrad players
Kavala F.C. players
PFC Velbazhd Kyustendil players
Aris Limassol FC players
First Professional Football League (Bulgaria) players
Second Professional Football League (Bulgaria) players
Super League Greece players
Cypriot Second Division players
Bulgaria international footballers
Bulgarian expatriate footballers
Expatriate footballers in Cyprus
Expatriate footballers in Greece
Association football forwards